Barry Johnson may refer to:

 Barry Johnson (GC) (born 1952), Royal Army Ordnance Corps soldier awarded the George Cross
 Barry Johnson (hurler) (born 1984), Irish sportsperson
 Barry Johnson (judoka) (born 1947), Australian Olympic judoka
 Barry Edward Johnson (1937–2002), English mathematician
 Barry Johnson (rugby league), rugby league footballer of the 1970s and 1980s
 Barry Johnson (musician), singer, songwriter, and guitarist of American punk rock band Joyce Manor
 Barry Johnson (artist), American artist

See also
 Barry Johnston (disambiguation)